Sānkǒu (三口) may refer to:

 Sankou, Huangshan, town in Huangshan District, Huangshan City, Anhui, China
 Sankou, Liuyang, town in Hunan, China